Radnage War Memorial is located at Mudds Bank, Radnage, Buckinghamshire, England. It is a grade II listed building with Historic England and commemorates the men of the village who died in the First and Second World Wars.

References

External links

Grade II listed monuments and memorials
Grade II listed buildings in Buckinghamshire
British military memorials and cemeteries
Buildings and structures completed in 1920